Týniště nad Orlicí is a town in Rychnov nad Kněžnou District in the Hradec Králové Region of the Czech Republic. It has about 6,000 inhabitants.

Administrative parts

Villages of Křivice, Petrovice, Petrovičky, Rašovice and Štěpánovsko are administrative parts of Týniště nad Orlicí.

Geography
It lies in the Orlice Table. It is situated on the right bank of the Orlice River.

History
The first written mention of Týniště nad Orlicí is from 1361. Before 1419, it became a market town. In 1914, it was promoted to a town by Franz Joseph I.

Demographics

Transport
The town lies at a railway junction.

Sights

The main landmark is the Church of Saint Nicholas. The current building was constructed in 1692, after the old wooden church was destroyed by a fire. The widest part of the church was built in 1788. A part of the church is the Baroque rectory from 1739.

Notable people
Jan Adolf Brandeis (1818–1872), painter and photographer
Vendelín Opatrný (1908–1944), army officer
George Chaloupka (1932–2011) Czech-Australian scientist, expert on Indigenous Australian rock art

Twin towns – sister cities

Týniště nad Orlicí is twinned with:
 Čierny Balog, Slovakia

References

External links

 

Cities and towns in the Czech Republic
Populated places in Rychnov nad Kněžnou District